The following is a complete episode list for the TV series Punk'd. Bold victims appeared on Punk'd more than once. The show began in 2003, but ended in 2007. The show resumed production after an extended hiatus for a ninth season in 2012.

Punk'd returned in 2020 on the new mobile streaming App Quibi, with Chance the Rapper as the new host. It debuted with 3 episodes for everybody and with an additional 3 episodes lead, if the user's email was entered on Quibi's website prior to launch.

Series overview

Episodes

Season 1: 2003

Season 2: 2003

Season 3: 2004

Season 4: 2005

Season 5: 2005

Season 6: 2005

Season 7: 2006

Season 8: 2007

Season 9: 2012

Season 10: 2015
 77. Chris Brown & K.Michelle
 78. A$AP Rocky & Miguel
 79. Michael B. Jordan & Rita Ora
 80. Sanaa Lathan & Trey Songz
 81. Russell Simmons & Zendaya
 82. Rosario Dawson & Meek Mill
 83. Naturi Naughton & King Bach
 84. Kevin Hart & Karrueche Tran

Season 11: 2020

Red carpet
The following is a list of stars interviewed on the red carpet in all four segments.

Ryan Pinkston – VH1 Big in 2002 Awards

Kid Rock and Pamela Anderson
Ray Liotta
Christina Aguilera
Denise Richards
Tori Amos
Christina Applegate
Eddie Griffin
Pierce Brosnan
Johnathon Schaech
Lifehouse

Ryan Pinkston – Diesel party

Dominic Monaghan and Billy Boyd
Lacey Chabert
Pauly Shore
Wilmer Valderrama
Brett Scallions
Christina Della Rose
Jon Abrahams
Eric Balfour
Danny Masterson and Wilmer Valderrama
Aaron Paul

Foreign interviewer for Entertainment Weekly

Alicia Silverstone
Maria Menounos
Nicole Richie
Dulé Hill
Rose McGowan
Philip Bloch
Taryn Manning
Wilmer Valderrama

Foreign interviewer – Gothika premiere

Penélope Cruz
Robert Downey Jr.
James Lesure
Kathleen Mackey
Halle Berry

References

Lists of American comedy television series episodes
Lists of American reality television series episodes
Lists of practical jokes